The Diamond Valley Cinder Cone is an extinct cinder cone in Washington County, Utah. It's the youngest volcano in Washington County. It's located between Diamond Valley and Snow Canyon State Park. The Cinder Cone Trailhead is a trail that leads up to the crater. It is one of the volcanoes in the Santa Clara Volcanic Field.

Volcanoes of Utah
Cinder cones of the United States